Rafael Navarro-Gonzalez, also known as Rafael Navarro-González and Rafael Navarro, was a Mexican NASA astrobiologist who worked with the Curiosity rover on the planet Mars, and who helped lead researchers in the identification of ancient organic compounds on the planet. He was an internationally recognized scientist who merged laboratory simulations, field studies and modeling based on biology, chemistry and physics. Navarro-Gonzalez noted the significance of volcanic lightning in the origin of life on Earth. His professional work included the SAM component on the Mars Science Laboratory, and the HABIT instrument on the Exomars mission.  

He died from complications of COVID-19 on January 28, 2021. In April 2021, NASA named a mountain, "Rafael Navarro Mountain", on the planet Mars in his honor.

Awards and honors 
 Alexander von Humboldt Medal (2009)
 Molina fellowship (first recipient)
 World Academy of Sciences Award in Earth Sciences

See also 
 List of mountains on Mars
 List of mountains on Mars by height

References

External links

1959 births
2021 deaths
Astrobiologists
ExoMars
Mars Science Laboratory
Mexico City
Mexican scientists
Planetary scientists
Deaths from the COVID-19 pandemic in Mexico